Anthony Atkinson may refer to:
 Tony Atkinson (1944–2017), British economist
 Anthony Atkinson (politician) (1681–1743), Irish politician